La Tour-en-Jarez is a commune in the Loire department in central France.

Population

Twin towns
La Tour-en-Jarez is twinned with:
  Vörstetten, Germany

See also
Communes of the Loire department

References

Communes of Loire (department)